F. Bill Goodwin (born Los Angeles, California, January 8, 1942) is an American jazz drummer.

Career
Goodwin began his professional career at the age of seventeen with saxophonist Charles Lloyd. During the 1960s, he worked with Mike Melvoin, Art Pepper, Paul Horn, Frank Rosolino, Bud Shank, George Shearing, and Gabor Szabo.

Joining the performing ensemble of vibraphonist Gary Burton brought him to the East Coast in 1969. After three years with Burton, Goodwin settled in the Pocono Mountains and worked in hotels and resorts. In 1974, he became a founding member of the Phil Woods Quartet. He worked with Woods for forty years as a drummer and record producer, winning three Grammy Awards.

He has performed with Bill Evans, Dexter Gordon, Jim Hall, Bobby Hutcherson, June Christy, Joe Williams, Tony Bennett, Mose Allison, and The Manhattan Transfer. He has been a featured performer at the W. C. Handy Music Festival for many years, serving as a member of the W. C. Handy Jazz All-Stars with guitarist Mundell Lowe, guitarist Tom Wolfe, pianist and vocalist Johnny O'Neal, pianist and vocalist Ray Reach, and drummer Chuck Redd.

He was featured on Tom Waits's 1975 album Nighthawks at the Diner and played talking drum on the song "Crown of Creation" by Jefferson Airplane.

Beginning in 2000, he taught at William Paterson University in New Jersey.

Goodwin is the son of Bill Goodwin, announcer and actor on the Burns and Allen radio program and The George Burns and Gracie Allen Show on television.

Discography

As leader
 Solar Energy (1981)
 Plays Cole Porter (1988)
 No Method (Fresh Sound, 1989)
 Three's a Crowd (TCB, 1994)
 Raise Four (Vectordisc 2014)
 Live at the Lafayette Bar (Vectordisc 2017)
 Trio with Jon Ballantyne and Evan Gregor (Vectordisc 2019)

As sideman
With Mose Allison
 I've Been Doin' Some Thinkin' (Atlantic, 1968)
With Gary Burton
 Throb (Atlantic, 1969)
 Gary Burton & Keith Jarrett (Atlantic, 1971)
 Live in Tokyo (Atlantic, 1971)
 Paris Encounter (Atlantic, 1972) with Stéphane Grappelli
With Hal Galper
 Wild Bird (Mainstream, 1972)
 Inner Journey (Mainstream, 1973)
With Paul Horn
 Cycle (RCA Victor, 1965)
 Here's That Rainy Day (RCA Victor, 1966)
 Monday, Monday (RCA Victor, 1966)
With Bill Plummer
 Cosmic Brotherhood (Impulse!, 1968)
With Gábor Szabó
 More Sorcery (Impulse!, 1967)
With Anthony Ortega
 New Dance (hatOLOGY, recorded 1967)

As producer
With Phil Woods
 Phil Woods/Lew Tabackin (Omnisound, 1980)
 More Live (Adelphi, 1982)
 At the Vanguard (Antilles, 1983)
 Dizzy Gillespie Meets Phil Woods Quintet (Timeless, 1986)
 Flowers for Hodges (Concord, 1991)
 Astor & Elis (Chesky, 1996)
 Mile High Jazz (Concord, 1996)
 Live at the Deer Head Inn'' (Deer Head Records, 2015)

References

External links 
Bill Goodwin bio at Phil Wood's website

1942 births
Living people
American jazz drummers
Record producers from California
Musicians from Los Angeles
20th-century American drummers
American male drummers
Jazz musicians from California
20th-century American male musicians
American male jazz musicians